Head of a Woman is a fragment of a Hieronymus Bosch painting, created c. 1500. It is currently in the Museum Boijmans Van Beuningen in Rotterdam, Netherlands. The fragment is only 13 cm tall and 5 cm wide.

References

1500s paintings
Paintings by Hieronymus Bosch
Paintings in the collection of the Museum Boijmans Van Beuningen